In Spring 1945, the U.S. Army's Information and Educational Branch made formal plans to establish  overseas university campuses for  American service men and women, awaiting demobilization, or redeployment to another theater. Three University centers were eventually established in the French resort town of Biarritz, the English town of Shrivenham, Berkshire, and in Florence, Italy. These three campuses were set up to provide a transition between army life and a successful transition to civilian life, with career training and possibly attendance at a university in the US. Most students attended for just one term.

Students removed their caps, and therefore the distinction between officers and enlisted personnel was eliminated.

A detailed discussion of these G. I. American Universities can be found at The G.I. University Project.

Florence American University
The first American university for service personnel was established in June 1945 at the School of Aeronautics in Florence, Italy. Some 7,500 soldier-students were to pass through the university during its four one-month sessions from July to November 1945.

Biarritz American University
Under General Samuel L. McCroskey, the hotels and casinos of Biarritz in France were converted into quarters, labs, and class spaces for U.S. service personnel. The university opened 10 August 1945, and approximately 10,000 students attended at least one eight-week term. BAU ran the longest of any of the centers and made a significant impact on both faculty and students, as well as the local community. The curriculum covered the range of subject of any state-side university, students established a full symphony orchestra, a choir, a theater group, and two basketball teams; a local hotel was rebuilt by the engineering class, a daily newspaper was published by the journalism program, and the theater program performed in local orphanages and hospitals. It was a return to "normal" and a stepping stone to a future for many.    After three successful terms, the university closed in March 1946.

Shrivenham American University
Under General C. M. Thiele, a British Army Camp near Swindon was converted into a university campus. After two successful terms, the university closed in December 1945. About 4,000 students attended each term.

References

Further reading
 Anon. "Contented G.I. s". Time 46, 21 (19 November 1945): 77–78.
 Beardsley, Wilfred Attwood. "Teaching Languages in the Army University in Florence." Hispania Vol. 30, No. 1 (Feb. 1947): 27–31.
 Dickman, A.J. "The G.I. University in Shrivenham, England: 1 August to 5 December 1945. The French Review 20 (1945): 18–20.
 James, Tony. The Army University Center No2 Biarritz, France, Precursor to the GI Bill. (2015?) https://bcmss.sciencesconf.org/conference/bcmss/BAU.pdf (accessed 3/14/2023).
 Loss, Christopher P. Between Citizens and the State: The Politics of American Higher Education in the 20th Century (2012) Princeton University Press. 108-111.
 MacKenzie, Norman. "Shrivenham." New Statesman and Nation,  17 Nov 1945, p. 329.
 Schmidt, George P. and J. G. Umstattd. “The American Army University at Biarritz, France.” Bulletin of the American Association of University Professors (Summer, 1946): Vol. 32, No. 2, 303-316 Stable URL: http://www.jstor.com/stable/40220155

External links
 Memories of Shrivenham

1945 establishments in France
1945 establishments in England
1945 establishments in Italy
1945 disestablishments in England
1945 disestablishments in Italy
1946 disestablishments in France
Aftermath of World War II in France
Aftermath of World War II in Italy
Aftermath of World War II in the United Kingdom
Educational institutions established in 1945
Educational institutions disestablished in 1946
History of Florence
History of Nouvelle-Aquitaine
History of Oxfordshire
History of veterans' affairs in the United States
Military units and formations established in 1945
Military units and formations disestablished in 1946
Training installations of the United States Army
Universities and colleges in Europe